"Roxanne" is a song by English rock band the Police. The song was written by lead singer and bassist Sting and was released as a single on 7 April 1978, in advance of their debut album Outlandos d'Amour, released 2 November. It was written from the point of view of a man who falls in love with a prostitute.

The song ranked No. 388 on the Rolling Stones "500 Greatest Songs of All Time" and was voted No. 85 by VH1 on its list of the "100 Greatest Rock Songs".

In 2008, "Roxanne" was inducted into the Grammy Hall of Fame.

Background
Police lead singer Sting wrote the song inspired by the prostitutes he saw near the band's seedy hotel in Paris, France, where the Police were lodged in October 1977 to perform at the Nashville Club. The song's title comes from the name of the character in the play Cyrano de Bergerac, an old poster of which was hanging in the hotel foyer.

Sting had originally conceived the song as a bossa nova, although he credits Police drummer Stewart Copeland for suggesting its final rhythmic form as a tango. During recording, Sting accidentally sat down on a piano keyboard in the studio, resulting in the atonal piano chord and laughter preserved at the beginning of the track. As a nod to the gaffe, Sting is credited in the liner notes for playing "butt piano." The Police were initially diffident about the song, but Miles Copeland III was immediately enthusiastic after hearing it; he became their manager and got them their first record deal with A&M Records.

According to Andy Summers:

"Roxanne" became the band's debut single for A&M Records. However, despite the praise given by Miles Copeland, the single did not chart upon its initial release. Writing in Record Mirror, singles reviewer Bev Briggs declared "This must be the big breaker for the Police .... what the hell, go out and buy it immediately".

The band released two further singles in the UK that year: "Can't Stand Losing You", which charted at number 42, and "So Lonely", which did not chart. Then, in early 1979, "Roxanne" was issued in North America as the group's first single there. Cash Box said it has "fast slashing rhythm guitar work, spacious arrangement and good singing." The Fort Worth Star Telegram rated it to be the 5th best single of 1979.

The song's international success spurred a UK re-release of "Roxanne" in April 1979, which reached  in the UK Singles Chart. A live solo version performed by Sting from the 1982 album The Secret Policeman's Other Ball received moderate airplay on album-oriented rock radio and reached  on the Billboard Top Tracks chart. The song went on to become a staple of Sting's performances during his solo career, and it was performed when the Police reunited in 2003 for their induction into the Rock and Roll Hall of Fame.

In 1997, "Roxanne" was remixed by American rapper and producer Puff Daddy for the compilation The Very Best of Sting & The Police. The remix, titled "Roxanne '97", featured raps from Pras and samples from UTFO's "Roxanne, Roxanne".

Acclaim
"Roxanne" has appeared on all of the Police's greatest hits albums. In 2004, Rolling Stone ranked it No. 388 on its list of the 500 Greatest Songs of All Time.

It is one of The Rock and Roll Hall of Fame's 500 Songs that Shaped Rock and Roll. In 2008, "Roxanne" was inducted into the Grammy Hall of Fame.

This was the first song the band performed live at the 2007 Grammy Awards to kick off their 30th Anniversary Reunion Tour.

Music videos
Two different music videos were released for "Roxanne". The first shows the band performing the song on a stage on what is perhaps a sound check to a show. Many slow motion shots of the group live appear here as well. The second version was shot on a sound stage and shows the band performing before a red backdrop.

Covers
IN 1997, Michael Franti did a cover of the song featured in the Nickelodeon film Good Burger.

In 2012, the song was covered by singer Juliet Simms for the reality television show, The Voice. Her cover reached number 86 on the Billboard Hot 100.

Sting also performed the song in 2015 on The Tonight Show Starring Jimmy Fallon, alongside Jimmy Fallon as part of a recurring sketch with three other men where they perform as the barbershop quartet the Ragtime Gals.

El Tango de Roxanne

For the 2001 jukebox musical romantic drama film Moulin Rouge! directed, produced, and co-written by Baz Luhrmann, the song "El Tango de Roxanne" was composed as a fusion of "Roxanne" with "Tanguera" by Mariano Mores. The message is similar, as stated by one character: "Never fall in love with a woman who sells herself." The song was performed by José Feliciano, Ewan McGregor and Jacek Koman. In the film, the song shows a combination of locations, memories and characters, anchored by the ensemble cast dancing tango.

Redlight by Swedish House Mafia

In 2022, the song was interpolated by lead singer Sting and Swedish house music supergroup Swedish House Mafia as "Redlight". It was released on 25 February 2022 as the fourth single from the group's debut studio album Paradise Again.

Charts

Weekly charts

1Roxanne '97 (Puff Daddy Remix)

Year-end charts

Certifications

Track listing

7": A&M / AMS 7348 (UK)
 "Roxanne" – 3:00 (Sting)
 "Peanuts" (single edit) – 2:52 (Stewart Copeland, Sting)

Personnel 

 Sting – bass guitar, lead and backing vocals, "butt piano"
 Andy Summers – electric guitar
 Stewart Copeland – drums

References

External links

Bibliography

1978 songs
1978 singles
1979 singles
A&M Records singles
The Police songs
Songs about prostitutes
Songs written by Sting (musician)